Jablaniške Laze is a dispersed settlement in the hills east of Šmartno pri Litiji in the historical region of Lower Carniola in Slovenia. The municipality is included in the Central Slovenia Statistical Region.

References

External links
Jablaniške Laze at Geopedia

Populated places in the Municipality of Šmartno pri Litiji